Jean-Pierre Marcon (born 21 February 1949 in Saint-Bonnet-le-Froid) was a member of the National Assembly of France.  He represented Haute-Loire's 1st constituency from 2007 to 2012 as a member of the Union for a Popular Movement.  He was the substitute candidate for Laurent Wauquiez in the 2007 election and replaced Wauquiez when he was appointed to the government. He did not contest the 2012 election.

References

1949 births
Living people
People from Haute-Loire
Politicians from Auvergne-Rhône-Alpes
Union for a Popular Movement politicians
Union of Democrats and Independents politicians
Deputies of the 13th National Assembly of the French Fifth Republic